Colonia Roma, also called La Roma or simply, Roma, is a district located in the Cuauhtémoc borough of Mexico City  just west of the city's historic center, and in fact is no longer a single colonia (neighbourhood) but now two officially defined ones, Roma Norte and Roma Sur, divided by Coahuila street.

The colonia was planned as an upper-class Porfirian neighborhood in the early twentieth century. By the 1940s, it had become a middle-class neighborhood in slow decline, with the downswing being worsened by the 1985 Mexico City earthquake. Since the 2000s, the area has seen increasing gentrification.

Currently Roma and neighbouring Condesa are known for being the epicenter of hipster subculture in the city, and rivals Polanco as the center of the city's culinary scene.  Besides residential buildings, the neighborhood streets are lined with restaurants, bars, clubs, shops, cultural centers, churches and galleries. Many are housed in former Art Nouveau and Neo-Classical buildings dating from the Porfiriato period at the beginning of the 20th century. Roma was designated as a "Barrio Mágico" ("magical neighborhood") by the city in 2011.

History

The area was a very shallow part of Lake Texcoco, dotted with tiny islands and one small island village of Aztacalco during the pre-Hispanic period. During the colonial period, the area dried up and became rural lands first owned by Hernán Cortés and then by the Counts of Miraville. In the late 19th and early 20th centuries, this area west of what was Mexico City proper was being turned into “modern” colonias for the wealthy seeking to escape the deterioration of city center. The colonia's height as an “aristocratic” and “European” enclave was from its founding in the 1900s until about the 1940s. However, wealthy residents began to move to newer neighborhoods as early as the 1940s and problems associated with urbanization began to appear in the 1950s. Older mansions began to give way to modern commercial buildings in the 1960s and 1970s as the deterioration became more serious. The 1985 Mexico City earthquake caused widespread destruction in the colonia, especially to newer and more commercial and apartment buildings, even causing one major development to mostly disappear.  Since then, there have been efforts to conserve the area's architectural heritage and regain some of its former prestige with some success.

Geography

Boundaries
Roma's borders are: 
 Avenida Chapultepec to the north, across which is the Zona Rosa, Colonia Juárez area
 Avenida de los Insurgentes to the west, across which is the Condesa district 
 Eje 4 Sur Benjamin Franklin, Antonio M. Anza and Viaducto Miguel Alemán to the south, across which are  Colonia del Valle and Colonia Narvarte 
 Avenidas Cuauhtémoc and Jalapa to the east, across which is Colonia Doctores
 In addition, a section (Roma Norte I) lies west of Insurgentes, whose borders are Chapultepec (N), Av. Veracruz (W), Parque España/Avenida Álvaro Obregón (S)

Avenida Coahuila divides Roma into the officially recognized neighborhoods of Roma Norte and Roma Sur.

Sub-districts
Roma consists of several sub-areas:

Roma Norte II and III
Roma Norte II and III, east of Avenida de los Insurgentes and north of Av. Coahuila, bisected by Roma's signature boulevard, Avenida Álvaro Obregón, is where the vast majority of the hippest restaurants, bars, clubs, etc. are found. It is home to about 1,100 mansions and other architecturally and historically important structures, mostly built between 1906 and 1939. Most of these are no longer residences but rather offices, cultural centers and other businesses.  Examples of these adaptations include the Casa Lamm Cultural Center, the Casa Universitaria del Libro, the main building of the Universidad de Londres and the various art galleries which are mostly found on Colima street. In the northeast corner of this area is the pre-Hispanic village of La Romita.

Roma Norte I – Cibeles area

Roma Norte I, west of Insurgentes, has fewer landmark buildings and is a mix of offices, restaurants, retail and residential. The Palacio de Hierro department store Durango branch occupies a city block here and the landmark Fuente de Cibeles fountain is at the center of a major cluster of restaurants, cafés and clubs.

La Romita

La Romita is a small section of Roma which used to be an independent village and colonia and whose streets are still significantly different from the rest of Roma. The territory of modern Colonia Roma in pre-Hispanic times consisted of the very shallow waters of Lake Texcoco and a number of very small islands of firm ground, on one of which stood the village of Aztacalco. It was an independent village  until the very early 20th century, when it was made its own colonia in 1903 with the name of La Romita. When Colonia Roma was created, Romita was officially incorporated into it, but the local residents fought redevelopment. The area has since developed semi-independently from the rest of Colonia Roma, both in infrastructure and socially. Even today, the area is relatively difficult to access, with narrow streets leading to a very small plaza and church called Santa María de la Natividad de Aztacalco (established in 1550). The local residents were of a significantly lower social class than the rest of Roma, with the wealthy residents avoiding it for fear of thieves. The area still has a reputation for crime and is found at the extreme northeast of the colonia near Metro Cuauhtémoc.

Roma Sur

East of Insurgentes and south of Coahuila street, Roma Sur is much more traditional than hip Roma Norte. There are many Latin American immigrants here, plus restaurants and shops catering to them. The Mercado Medellín is located here and is famous for Latin American goods and food as well. It continues to be a predominantly residential neighborhood and has not experienced the same level of gentrification as Roma Norte. This area of the district gained international attention as a result of Alfonso Cuarón's 2018 film Roma; Cuarón lived on Tepeji Street as a child.

Centro Urbano Benito Juárez

In the far southeast corner of Roma stands the Centro Urbano Benito Juárez, or Multifamiliar Juárez, a very large apartment complex in the 1940s and early 1950s.  It was one of several projects of this type by architect Mario Pani, designed to house city government workers and to be semi-autonomous with its own schools, administration, businesses etc. and incorporate as much outdoors space as possible.  Carlos Mérida’s mural work here was the most important of his career and the largest mural project in Mexico in the 20th century. Most of the complex and murals were destroyed by, or demolished after the 1985 Mexico City earthquake. Most of the land where the demolished buildings stood has become the Jardín Ramón López Velarde park.

Cityscape

The colonia was an exclusive area for the wealthy on the edge of the city when it was built in the very early 20th century. Roma started to decline around the mid 20th century and was heavily affected by the 1985 earthquake. In the 21st century, it has revived somewhat as a Bohemian area with restaurants, art galleries, offices and more. Today, the area attracts younger generations of artists, writers and urban hipsters, with rents rising once again.

Most of the streets are quiet and lined with large, leafy trees, mostly how they were laid out when the colonia was built. The largest street is Avenida Álvaro Obregón, whose traffic islands have large trees, walking paths and metal benches. On weekends, these islands fill with vendors selling art, antiques and collectibles. However, this and other of the larger streets such as Oaxaca, Querétaro and San Luis Potosí, were designated  as “ejes” or axis streets in the 1950s for through traffic.

Along with the tree lined streets, green spaces were also created with the addition of small parks called plazas. The old heart of the neighborhood is the Plaza Rio de Janeiro, originally called Plaza Roma.  This plaza is surrounded by a number of old mansions as well as a couple a tall modern towers. In the center, there is a fountain and a replica of Michelangelo’s David. One mansion that faces this plaza is popularly called the La Casa de las Brujas (House of the Witches) although its official name is the Edificio Rio de Janeiro. The popular name of this red-brick castle-like structure, built in 1908, comes from the face that seems to be formed by the windows on the top of the corner tower and the Art Deco entrance, which was added in the 1930s. The Plaza Luis Cabrera is on the corner of Guanajuato and Orizaba Streets. It was the setting for part of a short story called “La batallas en el desierto” by José Emilio Pacheco.

While there have been efforts to restore the area's reputation as aristocratic and upscale, the area still has problems associated with deterioration. There are a number of cabarets and men's clubs, which have attracted and sustained prostitution in the area. There are still unmaintained  and abandoned buildings in which live squatters and other very poor people. In the 1990s, there was a small, poor community of about 35 Otomi in the colonia, living in abject poverty. Most earned money and depend on community soup kitchens. Most lived as squatters in abandoned buildings.

Architecture

Roma is one of a number of “modern” colonias such as Colonia Juárez, Santa María la Ribera and Colonia San Rafael, which were built on what was the western edge of the city in the late 19th and early 20th centuries for wealthy residents looking to escape the city center. The streets and houses were designed and built based on European styles, which can still be seen today, especially on Orizaba, Alvaro Obregon, Colima and Tonalá Streets, where the older facades are best conserved. These were homes of bankers, factory owners, politicians, artists and businessmen who worked in the city center but lived here. Like its sister colonias, Roma has since lost many of its original mansion homes, but it has resisted this loss better. Today, there are an estimated 1,100 structures which date from the 1930s or earlier, compared to the 500 to 600 the remain in Santa María la Ribera and Colonia Juárez. Most of the area's historically and architecturally significant structures were built between 1906 and 1939. These earlier structures include examples of Neo-colonial (which imitate the styles built during Mexico's colonial period) and Art Deco, but most are “Porfirian,” meaning that they are a mix of French, Roman, Gothic and Moorish elements which were all fashionable in the late 19th and early 20th centuries. One of these old mansions was the home of television personality Paco Stanley, who says he bought the structure because of its “small friendly ghosts,” naming it “La Princesita” or The Little Princess. Stanley uses the property both as living space and office. These houses and streets have provided the backdrop for films such as Los Olvidados, filmed in La Romita by Luis Buñuel and literary works such as Batallas en el desierto by José Emilio Pacheco, Agua Quemada by Carlos Fuentes, Manifestacion de Silencios by Arturo Azuela and El Vampiro de la Colonia Roma by Luis Zapata.

However, the colonia now also has a large number of more modern structures, defined as having been built since the 1950s. These structures came to replace many of the original structures as the character of the colonia changed, along with the lack of urban planning, zoning and the destruction caused by the 1985 earthquake. Owners of many of the older structures have had or have wanted to demolish or radically change them for economic reasons, a process which still persists today. In cases where they have succeeded, modern office and apartment buildings have appeared. Not only are these structures taller and markedly different in design, they also weigh more, affecting the ground around them and causing damage to remaining earlier structures.

While the older mansions are no longer economically viable as residences, there has been efforts since the 1990s to save them, by converting them into offices, stores, restaurants and other businesses with restrictions aimed at conserving their facades and the colonia's overall character. Like neighboring Colonia Condesa, Roma has a number of cafes, restaurants and other eateries established in older structures (as well as newer ones), especially along Álvaro Obregón, Colima, and Orizaba streets, and on plazas Río de Janeiro and Luis Cabrera.

Demographics

The 2010 population of Roma Norte was 27,770 and of Roma Sur 17,406. The 2000 population of Roma Norte was 26,610 and of Roma Sur 17,406.

Since the 1990s, there was a small poor community of about 35 Otomi in the colonia, living in abject poverty. Most earned money and depend on community soup kitchens. Most live as squatters in abandoned buildings.

Jewish community in Roma and Condesa
In the 1930s and 40s many Jewish residents moved from downtown Mexico City to Roma and Condesa, where Yiddish was the unofficial language of Parque México, the local park. A few synagogues are still in operation on the Roma borough, like the Yehuda Halevi Synagogue. Today, in the Condesa borough, there are several more small orthodox synagogues hidden inside houses on Amsterdam Avenue, and another synagogue at the corner of Montes de Oca and Parral streets. In the 1950s, 60s, and 70s, Jews moved further west to Polanco, Lomas de Chapultepec, Interlomas, Bosques de las Lomas, and Tecamachalco, where the majority are now based.

Little Italy
Italians who had been living in the streets of La Merced since the late 1800s started to move to the area from the 1950's onward as they became economically stable. Many more started to move into the area from the 1990's to today.  Most have origins in northern Italy but southern Italy is also represented. The "Barrio Italiano" or "Via Italia" is along Calle Orizaba from Plaza Luis Cabrera to Plaza Rio de Janeiro up to Calle Puebla. Many Italian restaurants and gelaterias have sprung up with La Bella Italia being the most popular and the statue of The David holding celebrations for the Italian community when the Italian Team wins in football games.

Colombia Chiquita
Little Colombia has been forming along Medellin Avenue, especially in front of the Mercado Medellin since the late 1980s. Strong Colombian immigration has brought about a vibrant Colombian community with many Colombian businesses, especially restaurants, catering to the Colombian community and the rest of the city.

Little Spain
Little Spain comes about from the Spanish community from La Merced and Calle Lopez by Chinatown moving into La Roma in the 1940s. Especially as they became an economic powerhouse. More Spaniards kept immigrating to Mexico and the community kept growing into what today is Villa Madrid and Parque España where a replica of the Cibeles Fountain has been erected by the large community as a gift to the city that welcomed them with open arms. The Spanish community is very active and many regional Spanish institutions like Centro Gallego are also in the area along with many Spanish restaurants and shops in the area.

Economy

Shopping
Roma is home to free-standing Palacio de Hierro and Woolworth department stores. Enclosed malls include the Plaza Insurgentes shopping center, anchored by Sears, located on the site of the first Sears in Mexico, opened in 1947, and prior to that, the American Embassy. On Cuauhtémoc street are the Plaza Centro Cultural and Pabellón Cuauhtémoc. The large Parque Delta shopping center borders Roma on the south.

Restaurant scene
Many top chef-driven restaurants are located in Roma including two in the "Latin America's 50 Best Restaurants" list by San Pellegrino: Máximo Bistrot (chef Eduardo "Lalo" García); and Rosetta by chef Elena Reygadas. Other celebrated restaurants are Fonda Fina by chef Jorge Vallejo of Quintonil); Delirio and Casa Virginia by chef Monica Patino; Huset by Maycoll Calderon; and Cocina Conchita and La Docena for seafood.

The Mercado Roma, not a traditional public market but rather an upscale food hall, unites some of the city's diverse, upscale culinary offerings under one roof and was the first of an ever-expanding number of food halls in the city; while converted mansions such as Casa Quimera, Purveyor, Colima 256, Durango 216, Blanco Colima and Roma Quince offer a variety of restaurants, quality fast food, art, hip artisanal products and services in different rooms of the mansions.

Public markets
Mercado Medellín is located in Roma Sur (southern Roma) and is well known for offering products from other Latin American countries, particularly Cuba, Colombia and Venezuela.

Arts and culture

Art
Colima Street is home to a number of art galleries which have worked since the 1990s to establish themselves as an international art market to compete with New York, Paris, London and Tokyo. These galleries include the Landucci Gallery. Artists such as Mexican photographer Victor Carresquedo and American Barry Wolfryd have set up shop in the area as well as the Centro Libre de Arte, Mexico City's newest fine arts school. The goal is to promote Mexican art from its current status as regionally relevant to one with broader appeal, by not only promoting native artists more effectively at home but also by sponsoring international tours, featuring established artists such as Francisco Toledo, Roberto Márquez and Alfredo Castaneda as well as newer talents such as Cisco Jimenez and Guillermo Kuitca. The area is also attracting South American and Central American artists looking to break into the U.S. and world art markets.

It stands out for being one of the main points in the city where street art is present. You can find different murals made by national and international artists such as D*Face, Interesni Kaski, Saner, Revost among others.

Stage and cinema
The Centro Cultural (formerly Telmex) theater complex is located in the northeast corner of Roma, while Cine Tonalá is a well-known indie/art-house cinema in Roma Sur with a sister venue in Bogotá, Colombia. Cinemex multiplex cinemas are located in three enclosed shopping centers around Roma.

The district is the namesake for the 2018 film Roma, written and directed by Alfonso Cuarón, which takes place in the neighborhood during the 1970s.

Museums and libraries

Casa Lamm

The best known landmark in the district is the Casa Lamm. La Casa Lamm was a project to rehabilitate one of the old mansions which was supported by local authorities. Today, it is a cultural center and restaurant located in a restored mansion that dates to 1911 on Alvaro Obregon street. The institute consists of art exhibition space and management, some graduate level programs in the fine arts and a restaurant and bookstore, which are open to the public. Since it opened, it has hosted numerous art exhibitions.  In 1994, Casa Lamm, along with art galleries OMR and Nina Menocal have worked to make Roma a center for the visual arts in Mexico, attracting more galleries, artists and others to set up shop here.

The institute offers studies in poetry, novel writing and theater of the 20th century. It also offers a master's degree in Literary Appreciation and Creation, which combines both classes on criticism as well as workshops for writers mostly focusing on Latin American and European works. On the ground floor of the building, facing the street are the bookstore and restaurant. The restaurant, called "Nueve Nueve" is centered on an open-air patio accented by a black fountain.

Casa Universitaria del Libro
The Casa Universitaria del Libro (University House of Books) is located on Puebla and Orizaba Streets. The building dates from 1920, when it was built by Joaquin Barando for the McGregor family. During the Second World War it was used as the Brazilian embassy.  The Centro Asturiano took possession in the 1930s. When this institution moved to Polanco in 1986, it began to lease the building free to the Universidad Nacional Autónoma de México (UNAM). Although unproven, it is still rumored that the house was used for prostitution at one point and there is also local legend which states that a ghosts wanders through its halls, rooms and especially in the terrace. The bookstore specializes in the promotion of mostly written works produced by those associated with UNAM in the center of the city away from the Ciudad Universitaria. It sponsors approximately 250 activities per year such as book readings and signings, conferences, seminars and round tables. There is no other bookstore in Mexico dedicated solely to the promotion of a university's academic and literary production.

Museo Objeto del Objeto
Museo Objeto del Objeto (Object of the Object Museum or MODO) was inaugurated in 2010, following Mexico City's tradition of collectors founding or expanding museums with their personal collections. This museum is based on the collection of ordinary objects such as commercial packaging (especially beverage containers), advertisements, household appliances and more for a total of over 30,000 items collected by Bruno Newman over more than forty years. The museum is dedicated to communication and design, using the collection as a starting point for collaboration and research.

Casa del Poeta Museo Ramón López Velarde

Located on Alvaro Obregon and Córdoba streets, the Casa del Poeta is a museum and hosts libraries 'Salvador Novo' and 'Efraín Huerta'.

Churches

The Sagrada Familia Church is located on the corner of Puebla and Orizaba Streets. Its architecture is classified as Romanesque Revival and Gothic Revival, it was designed by Mexican architect Manuel Gorozpe. The first stone was laid in 1906, but most of structure was built between 1910 and 1912, of reinforced concrete. At the time, the church was criticized as “mediocre, ostentatious and of decadent taste”. In the 1920s, painter and Jesuit priest Gonzalez Carrasco decorated the interior with murals, with two smaller paintings realized by Hermano Tapia. The interior also contains the remains of Miguel Agustín Pro, a Jesuit priest executed by Plutarco Elias Calles in 1927 during the Cristero War and considered to be a martyr. The church is fronted by a small atrium bordered by a wrought-iron fence constructed by the Gábelich workshop, which was in neighboring Colonia Doctores. It is one of the few wrought iron works to survive from the early 20th century.

On Avenida Cuauhtémoc between Querétaro and Zacatecas streets is the Nuestra Señora del Rosario Church, which was built by Mexican architects Angel and Manuel Torres Torija. This church is Gothic Revival begun in 1920 and concluded in 1930. While built after the Porfirio Díaz era  of the late 19th and early 20th century, the church shares many of the features as churches from that time. Records indicate that the project was probably planned around 1911 but was delayed due to the Mexican Revolution. The facade contains a decorative rose window, common to Gothic styles with ojival doors and windows. The interior is spacious with three naves with notable stained glass windows with orient themselves vertically.

Parks and recreation

The neighborhood contains small public squares at Plaza Luis Cabrera, Plaza Río de Janeiro, Plaza Villa de Madrid (more commonly known as "Cibeles" as it contains the Fuente de Cibeles fountain, a replica of the one in Madrid), and tiny Plaza Juan Rulfo. Two full-size parks are Jardín Pushkin and Jardín Ramón López Velarde, while there are pocket parks at Jardín Edith Sánchez Ramírez and at the corner of Querétaro and Tonalá streets. Avenida Alvaro Obregon has a pedestrian median (camellón) lined with gardens and fountains with characters from Roman and Greek mythology.

Education
In addition to the educational programs at the Casa Lamm and the Casa Universitaria del Libro, Roma has a number of private educational institutions from primary school to university. Some, such as the Instituto Pedagogico Anglo Espanol, the Instituto Renacimiento and the Colegio Mexico have been established since the first half of the 20th century.

There are two universities based in Roma. The Universidad de Londres is a mostly business college. Its main campus is in Colonia Roma, but it also has eight other facilities in other parts of Mexico City and three in other parts of Mexico. The Roma campus is housed in one of the palatial mansions from the Porfirian era on Orizaba street. It offers twenty bachelor's degrees, eight master's and eight certificate programs.

The Universidad de las Américas de la Ciudad de México (UDLA) was founded  in 1940 as the Mexico City Junior College (MCC). In the 1960s, its name changed to the University of the Americas and shortly thereafter to the current one. It was founded in Colonia Roma but moved to a facility on the Mexico City-Toluca highway. When the institution split in the 1980s, one campus moved to Puebla and the other moved to the current location back in Colonia Roma in newly built facilities. UDLA offers seven bachelor's degrees, four graduate degrees and various certificate programs. It is located in a modern facility on Puebla Street.

Colegio Amado Nervo is a private school in Colonia Roma Sur.

The Colegio Liceo Mexicano, a private elementary school, is in Colonia Roma. Several other small public and private school and universities exist in the area.

Transportation
The neighborhood has public bus, Metrobus bus rapid transit, pesero (minibus), trolleybus and metro (subway/underground) service, as well as EcoBici bikeshare stands. Metro stations are all at the edges of the neighborhood and include Sevilla, Insurgentes, Cuauhtémoc, Centro Médico, and Chilpancingo.

Roma is bordered or crossed by several ejes viales (main crosstown arteries, mostly one-way): 1 Sur (two-way, Chapultepec), 2 Sur (eastbound, Yucatán/Querétaro/San Luis Potosí), 1 Poniente (two-way, Cuauhtémoc), 2 Poniente (northbound, Monterrey), and 3 Poniente (southbound, Yucatán/Medellín). The southern boundary of the neighborhood is the Viaducto Miguel Alemán freeway.

References

External links

Brief history in Spanish
Images of Colonia Roma

 
Cuauhtémoc, Mexico City
Roma
Hipster neighborhoods
Jewish communities in Mexico
Restaurant districts and streets in Mexico